In philately, a Coronation issue is an issue of postage stamps made by the British Post Office and the Post Offices of Commonwealth countries and British dependencies to celebrate the coronation of a new monarch.

These stamps are often considerably more ornate and detailed than definitive issue stamps generated by the same jurisdictions; as such they are greatly favored by many collectors. A particularly favored approach is to attempt to gather all such stamps issued in honor of a particular monarch by all of the jurisdictions issuing them.

As Elizabeth II had been the British monarch for over half a century and hers is to date the last event so commemorated, there are no recent "Coronation issue" stamps as envisioned here.  However, other monarchies also issue stamps honouring the accession of a new monarch and these stamps could obviously be defined as "coronation issues" as well.

See also
Omnibus issue

Postage stamps of the United Kingdom
Topical postage stamps